Michael David Adamthwaite (born September 1, 1981) is a Canadian actor. He is credited with providing the voice for many characters in various anime series. He is also known for portraying the Jaffa Herak in the science fiction television series Stargate SG-1. He is best known as the voice of Jay in the Cartoon Network show Lego Ninjago: Masters of Spinjitzu.

Filmography

Animation
 Dinotrux – Downdraft the Dozeratops
 Dirk Gently's Holistic Detective Agency — Zed
 Dragons II: The Metal Ages — Prince Dev
 Fantastic Four: World's Greatest Heroes — Namor
 Firehouse Tales — Petrol
 Hulk Versus — Balder
 Mega Man: Fully Charged — Sergeant Breaker Night/Lord Obsidian, Duane, Mary Flair
 Iron Man: Armored Adventures — Justin Hammer/Titanium Man, J.A.R.V.I.S.
 Nerds and Monsters — Durn
 Next Avengers: Heroes of Tomorrow — Thor
 Ninjago — Jay, Mezmo, Fang-Suei, Mailman, Raggmunk
 Supernoobs — Jock Jockerson, Zenblock, Mr.Wetz
 X-Men: Evolution — Colossus
 Zeke's Pad — Zeke Palmer

Live action roles 
 The Sandlot: Heading Home (2007) - Dodger Pitcher
 Final Destination 5 — Line Cook
 Big Time Movie - Rikard
 Horns (2013) — Eric Hannity
 Psych — Rory
 Smallville — Ricky (episode: "Crossfire")
 Stargate SG-1 — Herak
 Timeless — Wes Gilliam
 The Twilight Saga: New Moon — Chet
 Warcraft — Magni Bronzebeard
 Walking Tall (2004) — Burke
 The BFG (2016) — Butcher Boy (voice and motion-capture)
 War for the Planet of the Apes (2017) — Luca (motion-capture)
 In the Name of the King: Two Worlds — Thane
 Maximum Conviction (2012) — Collins
 Fast Layne — Clint Riggins
 Supernatural — Security Guard Bill

Dubbing roles

Animation
 Black Lagoon: The Second Barrage — Ginji Matsuzaki
 Boys Over Flowers — Tsukasa Domyoji
 Death Note — Raye Penber, Anthony Rester
 Dinosaur Train — Jess the Hesperornis, Reggie the Raptorex
 Dragon Drive — Hikaru Himuro
 Dynasty Warriors: Gundam 2 — Seabook Arno, Kyoji Kasshu
 Dynasty Warriors: Gundam 3 — Seabook Arno, Kyoji Kasshu, Ribbons Almark
 Future Boy Conan - Dongoro 
 Ghost in the Shell: Stand Alone Complex The Laughing Man OVA — The Laughing Man
 Gintama° – Toshiro Hijikata
 Hikaru no Go — Seiji Ogata
 Infinite Ryvius — Fu Namuchai
 Inuyasha: The Final Act — Byakuya, Ginka, Naohi, Wolf demon graveyard protector
 Kingdom series – Chang Wen Jun
 Kiznaiver — Kazunao Yamada
 Kurozuka — Arashiyama
 Master Keaton — Heinrich
 MegaMan NT Warrior — Mr. Hikari
 Mobile Suit Gundam SEED — Yzak Joule
 Mobile Suit Gundam SEED Special Edition — Yzak Joule
 Mobile Suit Gundam SEED Destiny — Yzak Joule
 Mobile Suit Gundam 00 — Narrator, Ribbons Almark, Emilio
 Nana — Kyosuke Takakura
 Project ARMS — Cliff Gilbert
 Ronin Warriors — Mukala
 Sinbad - Captain Razzak
 Star Ocean EX — Chin
 Sword of the Stranger — No Name
 The Little Prince — Muche-Muche (The Planet of the Grelon) Antoine, the astronomer (The Star Snatcher's Planet)
 The Story of Saiunkoku — Shuei Ran, Coutier 1, High Government Official 1
 Tokyo Underground – Seki
 Transformers: Cybertron – Lugnutz
 Trouble Chocolate — Truffle
 Zoids Wild — Quade

Live-action
 Death Note — Raye Iwamatsu (Raye Penber)

 Video games 
 Dynasty Warriors Gundam 2 – Kyoji Kasshu, Seabook Arno
 Dynasty Warriors Gundam 3 – Kyoji Kasshu, Ribbons Almark, Seabook Arno
 Mobile Suit Gundam: Encounters in Space – Yuu Kajima
 Mobile Suit Gundam SEED: Never Ending Tomorrow – Yzak Joule
 Lost Judgment – High Court Judge
 Zoids Wild: Blast Unleashed'' – Quade, Deleters

References

External links 

 
 

Living people
20th-century Canadian male actors
21st-century Canadian male actors
Canadian male film actors
Canadian male television actors
Canadian male video game actors
Canadian male voice actors
Male motion capture actors
Place of birth missing (living people)
1981 births